Bromance is a 2015–16 Taiwanese romantic comedy television series starring Baron Chen, Megan Lai, Bii, Sean Lee and Katie Chen. The series was produced by Sanlih E-Television and showcased every Sunday.

For her performance in Bromance, Megan Lai won Best Actress at the 2015 Sanlih Drama Awards.

Plot
When Pi Ya Nuo (Megan Lai) was born, her arrival was eagerly received by her parents, extended family, and their fortune teller, who gathered in the delivery room to bless the beginning of the Pi Family's heir. Upon hearing her first cry, the fortune teller predicted on the spot that the baby "boy" would grow up to be a great success and a natural-born leader. But when the nurses announced that the baby was a girl, the stunned fortune teller immediately announced that the girl would not survive childhood unless she lived as a boy for the first 25 years of her life; only then could Ya Nuo change her bad fate and bring prosperity to her family.

Having lived her life as a boy, Ya Nuo was shy and always tried to keep her distance from people to hide her true identity. This mysterious aloofness made her irresistible to the girls around her. One day, she accidentally helped out Du Zi Feng (Baron Chen), who happened to be a triad leader, and his sister, Du Zi Han (Mandy Tao). While Zi Han fell in love with Ya Nuo, Zi Feng became Ya Nuo's "sworn brother" and best friend. Now, with her 26th birthday approaching, Ya Nuo hopes to reveal her true gender without any repercussions.

Cast

Main cast
Baron Chen as Du Zi Feng 杜子楓
Megan Lai as Pi Ya Nuo 琵亞諾
Bii as Wei Qing Yang 衛青陽 
Sean Lee as Chu Zhe Rui 楚哲瑞
Katie Chen as Yang Na Na 楊娜娜

Supporting cast
Mandy Tao as Du Zi Han 杜子涵
Amanda Chou as Fan Xiao Jing 范小菁
Yang Ming Wei as Liao Guang Chao 廖廣超
Tou Chung-hua as Du Guang Zhu 杜光柱
Linda Liu as Sister Feng
Tang Chih-wei as Ya Nuo's father
Wang Chuan as Ya Nuo's mother
Joseph Hsia as Nan Xing Tian 南刑天
Chen Wei Min as Wu Wan Hao 吳萬豪
Edison Wang as Wu Han Sheng 吳翰昇

Special guest actors
Samuel Tai as Master Yong Chun Quan
Esther Wu as high school student
Eunice Lin as high school student
Fang Yu Xin (方語昕) as high school student
Lia Lee as Amy Guo 郭Amy
Cheng Xue Shu (程學書) as fortuneteller
Titan Huang as boss 
Wang De Sheng (王德生) as Zi Feng's chief men
He Jie Rou as child Xiao Jing
Chiu Yi Tien as child Ya Nuo
GJ as cruise ship singer
Yumi Chao as child Zi Han
Tsai Rui Ze as child Zi Feng
Le Le (樂樂) as child Yan Ting
Mario Pu as Magazine Editor
?? as child Zhe Rui
Lin Xuan Yu (林萱瑜) as Eva
Jin Wen as Wu Mei Li 盧美麗

Soundtrack
"Epochal Times" (心時代) by Bii, Andrew Tan, Ian Chen, Dino Lee
"Bottom Line" (底線) by Landy Wen
"Back in Time" (逆時光的浪) by Bii
"Tender Love / Love you Gently" (愛是妳給的溫柔) by Bii
"Quietness" (安靜) by Andrew Tan feat. Miu Zhu
"Sunny Day" (晴天) by Derrick Hoh
"Fake" (假裝不了) by Derrick Hoh
"No One" (沒有之一) by GJ

Production

Filming began on September 19, 2015 and the first media conference was held on September 29, 2015. The filming ended on February 3, 2016.

The show began airing on TTV Main Channel on October 18, 2015 and concluded on February 21, 2016. A total of 18 episodes were released. Later, the show was aired online on LINE TV beginning October 19, 2015, followed by showing on SET Metro (Chinese: 三立都會台).

Director 
 Rong-hui Chen (陳戎暉)

Writers 
 Pi-Chen Chen (陳碧真)
 Han-Wen Cheng (鄭涵文)
 Hsiao-Jen Fang (方孝仁)
 Pei-Yu Lin (林珮瑜)
 Hui-Ting Shao (邵慧婷)

Production Team 
 Jun-Yi Rong (戎俊義), Producer
 Pi-Chen Chen (陳碧真), Executive Producer
 Ya-An Lo (羅雅安), Project Producer
 Hsiao-Jen Fang (方孝仁), Producer
 Yi-Chun Pan (潘逸群), Executive Producer

Stunt Coordinator 
 Eddie Tsai

Broadcast

The show was first broadcast on TTV on October 18, 2015. It aired in the Sunday night 10:00–11:30 pm time slot, which was previously occupied by When I See You Again.

Episode ratings

Awards and nominations

References

External links
Bromance TTV Website  
Bromance SETTV Website  
  
Bromance Winsepang  

2015 Taiwanese television series debuts
2016 Taiwanese television series endings
Sanlih E-Television original programming
Taiwan Television original programming